Silvano Benedetti (born 5 October 1965) is an Italian former professional footballer who played as a defender.

His son Simone is a footballer.

Club career
Raised in Turin, after two years in Serie B with Parma and Palermo he was loaned to Ascoli, newly promoted to Serie A, debuting 14 September 1986 in Milan - Ascoli (0–1), after serving a month ban following a betting scandal in which he was involved. Returning to Torino, he remained there for four seasons, suffering relegation at the end of 1988–89, the immediate promotion (1989–90), success in the Mitropa Cup and the final of the UEFA Cup in 1991–92. At the end of that season was bought by Roma.

With the Giallorossi he played as a starter in the 1992–93 season, when the team lost Coppa Italia final, in which he scored an own goal against Torino in the final. With Roma he scored four goals in total. He closed his career after a brief stint at Alexandria in Serie C1.

He made a total of 166 appearances in Serie A with Ascoli, Torino and Roma, scoring 7 goals.

Since 2001 he has been part of the Torino staff, focusing specifically on the football school. On 5 July 2014 his contract was renewed to 30 June 2016, as the head of Torino youth system.

Honours

Club
Torino
 UEFA Cup: 1991–92 Runner-up
 Serie B: 1989–90
 Mitropa Cup: 1991

Ascoli
 Mitropa Cup: 1987

References

External links
National team statistics on FIGC.it
Silvano Benedetti on LegaSerieA.it, Lega Serie A.
Statistics on Emozionecalcio.it

1965 births
Living people
Italian footballers
Italy under-21 international footballers
Association football defenders
Serie A players
Serie B players
Serie C players
Torino F.C. players
Parma Calcio 1913 players
Palermo F.C. players
Ascoli Calcio 1898 F.C. players
A.S. Roma players
U.S. Alessandria Calcio 1912 players